Sophie Unwin (born 23 July 1994) is a visually impaired British racing cyclist who competes in para-cycling tandem road and track events. She made her maiden Paralympic appearance representing Great Britain at the 2020 Summer Paralympics.

Career 
Sophie began paracycling after attending an open talent event in August 2020. She won the bronze medal in the individual pursuit at the 2020 Summer Paralympics alongside Jenny Holl. She also partnered with Holl to claim silver in the women's road race B event during the 2020 Summer Paralympics.

They won the gold medal in the tandem B time trial at the 2021 UCI Para-cycling Road World Championships.

She represented England at the 2022 Commonwealth Games and competed in the women's tandem event. She finished third in the competition however, no bronze medal was awarded as the minimum five entries did not compete, after a late withdrawal from the fifth entered team. This prompted Unwin to protest against the decision to not award her a bronze medal despite finishing third. She along with her pilot Georgia Holt attempted to stand behind the podium ceremony with the flag of England before being escorted/moved by a security staff member and as a result Unwin was subsequently fined for breaching the code of conduct and she left the scene with tears.

References

1994 births
Living people
Scottish female cyclists
Paralympic cyclists of Great Britain
Cyclists at the 2022 Commonwealth Games
Cyclists at the 2020 Summer Paralympics
Paralympic silver medalists for Great Britain
Paralympic bronze medalists for Great Britain
Medalists at the 2020 Summer Paralympics
Paralympic medalists in cycling